Arran carpets are a carpet variety of carpets of the Karabakh carpet type.

History
Barda was the center of Arran carpets production. From the second half of the 19th century these carpets began to be produced in Jabrayil weaving factories under the name "Ərran", referring to the Ərran region. It is known that in the 9th-10th centuries Barda was the center of this region. More recently, Arran carpets have been called "Jabrail" because they are widely produced in Jabrayil carpet weaving factories.

Characteristics
The composition of the decorative pattern in the middle section of the Aran carpets consists of tasseled buta. These buta patterns - the main elements - are rarely but specifically placed in the middle field according to paisley-patterned carpets. Buta contains a description of birds and different shapes.

Arran carpets are woven in different formats. Density of knots is 4 knots per cm (160,000 knots per square meter). Pile length is 7 mm.

See also
Azerbaijani rug
Karabakh carpet

References

Azerbaijani rugs and carpets
Oriental rugs and carpets
Azerbaijani culture